The 2012 Trinidad Quadrangular T20 is a Twenty20 cricket tournament held in Trinidad & Tobago. The tournament is played for the Trinidad and Tobago's 50th year of independence. The tournament was scheduled to be a 6-match Twenty20 series between Trinidad & Tobago, Barbados, Bangladesh and Afghanistan. The matches in this series were not classified as official Twenty20 International matches, but instead classified as practice matches. The champions received a prize money of $50,000.

Rules and regulations 
In the tournament points are awarded to the team as follow ;

Each team will play 3 matches.
The team with highest points will win the championship.
If 2 team's point are equal then the champions will be decided by head-to-head result.
If 3 or more team's points are equal then the champions will be decided by Net Run Rate.

Squads

2012 Trinidad and Tobago Quadrangular T20 Series

Matches

Statistics

References 

Trinidad and Tobago Quadrangular Twenty20
Trinidad and Tobago Quadrangular Twenty20
Trinidad and Tobago Quadrangular Twenty20
Cricket in Trinidad and Tobago
2012 in Caribbean sport